Assing "Aki" Aleong (born December 19, 1934) is a Trinidad and Tobago–born American character actor and singer who has also been active in songwriting and musical production.  His first important role was in the 1957 movie No Down Payment, which starred Joanne Woodward and Jeffrey Hunter. He is probably best known for portraying Senator Hidoshi during the first season of Babylon 5, as well as portraying Mr. Chiang, the aide to Nathan Bates in the weekly series of V: The Series. He also portrayed the character of Colonel Mitamura in Farewell to the King. He owned the Gingham Dog fast food restaurant in Hollywood, California, c. 1965.

He co-wrote and produced the nonsense doo-wop record Shombalor by Sheriff and the Ravels for Vee-Jay records in 1958.

He has a listing in the Top Pop Singles 1955–2008 by Joel Whitburn, with "Trade Winds, Trade Winds" appearing in November 1961. The song peaked at No. 101 in Billboard on the "Bubbling Under the Hot 100" charts, and it remained on the chart for four weeks. According to an interview with Aleong on YouTube ("Part 1 of Twyman Creative Insider Interview with Aki Aleong") the song was Number 1 in Los Angeles in 1961. While that is not exactly accurate, "Trade Winds, Trade Winds" did reach Number 10 on KDAY and Number 11 on KRLA, two L.A. Top 40 stations.

He is a member of the Media Action Network for Asian Americans (MANAA) and is the executive director for Asians in Media.

He starred as "Agent X" in the WongFu Productions YouTube short starring Ryan Higa, Agents of Secret Stuff.

He appeared on the television show, Hazel as Mike Shiga.

References

External links 
 
 

1934 births
Living people
American male film actors
American male television actors
American male singer-songwriters
American singer-songwriters
Trinidad and Tobago emigrants to the United States
People from Port of Spain
20th-century American male actors
20th-century American singers
20th-century American male singers